Tania Jane Lacy is an Australian comedian.

Early life and education
Originally from Toowoomba, Queensland, Lacy spent many of her early years travelling with her family. Her father, then an officer in the army, was posted to Singapore (where Lacy was actually born) twice and Lacy spent a few years at Army schools.

Career

Ballet and choreography
It was in Toowoomba that Lacy attended her first ballet class and very early on exhibited some degree of talent. It wasn't until the family had settled in Melbourne's outer eastern suburbs in the late 70's that Lacy was able to attend ballet classes again. She pursued the art vigorously and at the age of 12 was accepted into the Victorian College of the Arts School of Dance. Lacy decided not to attend instead opting to complete her education at a normal high school whilst pursuing her dance training after school hours. She completed her HSC in 1983 and was again accepted into the VCA for a full-time tertiary education. During her second year Lacy suffered a serious blow to her career plans when she sustained a severe knee injury in a dancing accident. After one year of rehabilitation Lacy found that her ballet career was effectively over.

Lacy then set out on a career as a choreographer. She choreographed many fashion parades in and around Melbourne and many of today's top Australian designers such as Bettina Liano, Peter Alexander and Allanah Hill had Lacy choreograph their parades.

It was during a taping for the Australian Broadcasting Corporation that Lacy was spotted and asked to choreograph and appear in Kylie Minogue's first clip Locomotion in 1987.

Television
Later that same year while dancing on Countdown, Lacy was spotted by Molly Meldrum who asked Lacy to open the show - her performance led to a job on a new show, The Factory on which she appeared weekly as roving reporter. Under the guidance of producers Neill Wilson and James Lipscombe, Lacy began to develop her own characters and sketches.
In 1989 the ABC axed The Factory. At the same time the series Countdown was reworked as Countdown Revolution which was produced by Molly Meldrum. In 1990 Lacy was made a host of the show with comedian Mark Little. Later that year Mark and Tania were fired from the show when they staged a mock strike.

Lacy went on to make appearances on Steve Vizard's Tonight Live but eventually found a home at Channel 9 where she initially starred on a show called Saturday at Ricks. When that show ended Lacy made many humorous appearance on shows like Midday.

In 2006 and 2007, Lacy starred in the internet/mobile web series called "Girl Friday" where she plays Miss Mann.

From 29 to 31 October 2007, Lacy appeared as a sexy Barrister Catherine Michael on Neighbours.

The stage
After a period at Nine, Lacy left to pursue her own projects. She staged a one-woman, sell-out show entitled All of Me which was premiered at the Melbourne International Comedy Festival and then toured it to Sydney and Brisbane. Later the show went to the Edinburgh Comedy Festival where Tania was nominated for a Best Newcomer Award and was shortlisted for the Perrier Award.

Short films 
Lacy went on to star in a number of short films such as Titsiana Booberini, which she also wrote. The film received much international acclaim, scoring the director, Robert Luketic, a three-picture deal. She also wrote and starred in Pussy Got Your Tongue? which won her the Nicole Kidman Best Actress award at Tropfest in 1997. Later that year she starred with Ben Mendlesohn in Tangerine Dream, winning the Best Actress Award at the Watch My Shorts Festival.

In 2000, Lacy went to Los Angeles where she staged a one-woman show entitled Suburban Refugee - it did an extended run at Theatre Theater in Hollywood. It was during this time that Lacy met her now-husband, motion graphics designer Ole Sturm who was working on Mission: Impossible 2. They got married in the Hollywood Hills in November 2000.

Writing 
Since returning to Australia in 2001, Lacy staged another one-woman show at the Melbourne International Comedy Festival entitled Tania Lacy is Coo Coo Bananas but more recently Lacy has remained out of the spotlight, focusing instead on the development of various film and TV scripts for local production company, MoodyStreet Kids, amongst them her "Virtually Kitty" film and a TV series she has developed with Miho Suzuki Gollings.

Filmography

Television
 Artscape. IOU: Mary Hardy - as Guest | ABC
 Neighbours - as Barrister Catherine Michael | Channel 10
 High Flyers - as Robyn Kettrick | West Street Productions
 Pig’s Breakfast - as Rebecca | West Street Productions
 Dilemma - as Guest | Artist Services
 Home & Hosed - as Guest | Artist Services
 Totally Full Frontal - as Guest | Channel 10
 Battle of the Sexes - as Regular Guest | Channel 10
 E! Entertainment (pilot) - as Presenter | Imagination Films
 Good Taste - as Presenter | Channel 10
 The Pitch - as Presenter | Bearcage Prod
 Raw FM - as Lateisha | ABC TV Drama
 The Adventures of Lano & Woodley - as Melanie | ABC Comedy
 Tonight Live - as Live Linx | Artist Services
 GMA - as Reporter | GTV 9
 A Current Affair - as Comedy Reporter | GTV 9
 Sex - as Reporter | GTV 9
 The Midday Show - as Roving Reporter & Sketchwork | GTV 9
 The Today Show - as Roving Reporter & Sketchwork | GTV 9
 Saturday At Ricks - as Presenter, Roving Reporter & Sketchwork | GTV 9
 Countdown Revolution - as Presenter/R. Rep & Sketchwork | ABC TV
 The Factory - as Presenter | ABC TV
 Hey, Hey It’s Saturday! - as Outside broadcast work | GTV 9

Film
 Accidents Will Happen - as Kylie Manson | 1999 | Fabienne Nicholas Prods.
 Jesus is Lord - as Dallas and as writer/director | 1999 | Melbourne Intl. Comedy Festival
 Tangerine Dream - as Bonnie | 1997 | VCA
 Titsiana Booberini - as Titsiana and as co-writer | 1996 | VCA
 Thump - as Natalie | 1996 | VCA
 Pussy Got Your Tongue - as Kitty and as writer | 1997 | Tropfest
 A Date With Destiny - as Queen of Mars | 1989 | Swinburne Prod.
 A Slow Night in Kuwaite Cafe - as Bathsheba | 1989 | Mark Gracie

Theatre
 CooCoo Bananas - self-devised one-woman show directed by Steve Kearney | 2002 | Melbourne International Comedy Festival
 Suburban Refugee - self-devised one-woman show directed by Steve Kearney | 2000 | Theatre Theater in Hollywood, LA
 Twelfth Night - as Fabian | 1999 | Melbourne Theatre Company
 Princess Smartypants and Cupid - as various | 1997 | Victoria Arts Centre Trust
 The Truth Game - as Wendy Pierce | 1996 | The Courthouse
 Behind The Play - as Tina | 1995 & 1993 | The Courthouse
 Behind the Play - as Tina | Barassis's Pub | 1995 & 1994
 Could I Have This Dance - as Monica | 1995 | Athenaeum II
 All Of Me - self-devised one-woman show directed by Kaarin Fairfax | 1994 | Melbourne Comedy Festival / Sydney / Brisbane / Edinburgh

Personal life
Lacy lives in Berlin, Germany with her husband Ole Sturm and their son, who was born in December 2005.

Lacy came out about having a borderline personality in November 2014.

References

External links
 Official website
 Official Girl Friday website

Australian women comedians
1965 births
Living people
People from Toowoomba
People with borderline personality disorder
People from Victoria (Australia)